Gundars Bērziņš (26 September 1959 – 8 January 2023) was a Latvian accountant and politician and a Deputy of the Saeima since 1993. He was a member of the People's Party. He served as the Minister of Finance of Latvia from 2000 to 2002 and Minister of Healthcare from 2004 to 2007.

Bērziņš died on 8 January 2023, at the age of 63.

References

1959 births
2023 deaths
People from Jēkabpils Municipality
Communist Party of Latvia politicians
Latvian Farmers' Union politicians
People's Party (Latvia) politicians
Ministers of Finance of Latvia
Ministers of Health of Latvia
Deputies of the 5th Saeima
Deputies of the 7th Saeima
Deputies of the 8th Saeima
Deputies of the 9th Saeima
Riga Technical University alumni